Peter Martin Christopherson (also known as Sleazy, 27 February 1955 – 25 November 2010) was an English musician, video director, commercial artist, designer and photographer, and former member of British design agency Hipgnosis.

He also co-founded the Industrial Records band Throbbing Gristle (TG). After the disbandment of Throbbing Gristle, he participated in the formation of Psychic TV along with Genesis P-Orridge and Geoff Rushton—Rushton later changed his name to John Balance.

After his short time in Psychic TV, Christopherson formed Coil with Balance, which lasted for just under 23 years, until Balance died of a fall in the Weston-super-Mare home he shared with Christopherson. Christopherson participated in the reunification of Throbbing Gristle and, after his relocation to Thailand in 2005, composed an album for his solo endeavour The Threshold HouseBoys Choir. Christopherson died in his sleep on 25 November 2010.

Early life
Christopherson was born on 27 February 1955 in Leeds, Yorkshire, England. His father, Derman Christopherson, was a professor of engineering who became master of Magdalene College, Cambridge. Following school, Christopherson studied computer programming, theatre design, and video at the University at Buffalo in Buffalo, New York,  where he developed an interest in performance art and the work of avant-garde photographers such as Robert Mapplethorpe and Arthur Tress.

Throbbing Gristle, Psychic TV, and Coil
Christopherson was a founding member of Throbbing Gristle, who are credited with creating the industrial music genre before disbanding in 1981. Following the split, members Chris Carter and Cosey Fanni Tutti formed Chris & Cosey, while Christopherson and the band's other member Genesis P-Orridge formed Psychic TV with John Balance and other musicians.

Balance met Christopherson as a Throbbing Gristle fan and the two became intimate partners. Christopherson worked on the first two Psychic TV albums, Force the Hand of Chance and Dreams Less Sweet, joined by Balance on the latter. The two performed live several times with Psychic TV prior to forming their own project Coil.

Coil consisted of Christopherson and Balance, while Steven E. Thrower occasionally played bass guitar and drums. Balance was the lyricist and also played Chapman Stick and some keyboards.

Over two decades, Coil released myriad recordings, in addition to contributing to the work of other artists. They recorded parts of the album The New Backwards at Nothing Studios in New Orleans, owned by musician Trent Reznor at the time. In the liner notes of the 2008 CD release, Christopherson wrote: "Thanks to everyone there, especially Trent Reznor who made it all possible."

Despite Christopherson's long and extensive history as a musical artist, he only released two tracks under the name "Peter Christopherson". The first, "In My Head A Crystal Sphere of Heavy Fluid", appeared on the compilation Foxtrot, a benefit album for Balance's rehabilitation from alcohol dependence, while the second, "All Possible Numbers", appeared eleven years later on Autumn Blood (Constructions) released on Fourth Dimension Records.

In 2005, following the death of Balance, Christopherson relocated from England to Bangkok, Thailand and founded the solo project The Threshold HouseBoys Choir. He also released the final Coil CDs—The Remote Viewer, Black Antlers, ...And The Ambulance Died in His Arms and The New Backwards—on the band's own Threshold House label. In addition to the CD releases, Christopherson also released a 16-DVD box set following his relocation, entitled Colour Sound Oblivion, that was produced in a wooden box, in which a fifteen-page booklet, the program for Balance's funeral ceremony and a large collection of 6-inch × 4-inch postcards (mainly tour photographs) were also included.

Throbbing Gristle also reformed for a few concerts in 2005 and announced a new album called Part Two. The group announced several additional concerts in 2007 for the promotion of the album.

Other musical projects 
In 2007 Christopherson released the debut album of The Threshold HouseBoys Choir. The album, Form Grows Rampant, consists of five "parts" or songs, and includes a DVD of the album set to video footage of Thai rituals in Krabi, Thailand. One tour promoter who organized a Threshold HouseBoys Choir concert described it as "easily the most shocking thing I have ever experienced".

In 2008 Christopherson and Ivan Pavlov (aka CoH) started a new project called Soisong. The band officially premiered in Tokyo on 9 March 2008 and later performed several shows in Europe, having self-released their debut EP. As part of the tour, Soisong performed a live soundtrack to Derek Jarman's film Blue in Rovereto, Italy. In April of the same year, Christopherson and Pavlov, alongside David Tibet, Othon Mataragas and Ernesto Tomasini, also performed a live soundtrack for The Angelic Conversation in Turin, Italy.

In 2009 Soisong recorded their first full-length album xAj3z, the release of which was followed by a European Reunion Tour and a worldwide campaign in search of the band's missing virtual vocalists featured on the record. In 2010 Soisong declared a "Split Phase 2010", during which all of the members would concentrate on their personal work; however, two independently recorded solo EPs, both entitled Soisong, were scheduled for release. Christopherson never finalized his work for the release, but Soisong Split was eventually published in September 2012, nearly two years after Christopherson's death. The release consists of a CoH Soisong EP by Pavlov, originally recorded in 2010, and a collection of four unpublished sketches by Christopherson that were made available on the band's website.

In 2010 Christopherson started collaborating with Hirsute Pursuit, featuring Harley Phoenix and Bryin Dall, via email. They finished two songs together, "One Sleazy Night in Bangkok" and "One Sleazy Night in New Orleans", for the album Tighten That Muscle Ring. The album was signed to Cold Spring Records, but Christopherson died prior to its release. Writing for the Quietus online publication, Luke Turner claimed that the album was "the most sexy and perverted album of 2012".

Also in 2010, Christopherson was sent an iPad by musician Trent Reznor that contained music for a potential collaboration. Reznor had asked for his blessing to use the moniker "How to Destroy Angels" for a musical project that Reznor was creating with his wife (Christopherson had used the phrase in 1984, as the title of the first recording released by Coil). Christopherson responded amenably, suggesting that they could potentially collaborate as part of the project. Christopherson explained that Reznor was a "perfect gentleman" in regard to the way in which the matter was negotiated; however, Christopherson died before he was able to resend the iPad back to Reznor with his contribution.

The final music that was ever recorded by Christopherson occurred in Bangkok, Thailand with a project named "Electric Sewer Age" that also involved musician Danny Hyde. The original intention of the recordings was to complete a series of releases called "Moons Milk", but an album called In Final Phase was eventually released in 2013, with only 999 numbered CD copies made available. The CD is packaged in record sleeve-style thickened cardboard, and each copy is numbered from 1 to 999, while the insert sleeve displays a picture of Christopherson in his Bangkok studio that was taken at the moment that the recording was completed.

Influence

Writing for The Guardian, Dave Simpson credited Christopherson with using digital samplers on-stage before the Fairlight CMI popularised sampling. Also writing for The Guardian, Alexis Petridis described Carter and Christopherson as "pioneers in technology", and noted a sampler that Carter had custom-built for Christopherson a number of years before sampling became popular. Christopherson explained Carter's construction and musical experimentation in a 1987 interview with Keyboard magazine:
It was a box that [TG synthesist] Chris Carter made for me, to my design that basically switched on and off – through inputs on tape recorders – six cassette machines, the output of each going to a different key. Many of the machines I used in TG were cassette machines that were stripped down and altered to play backward and forward and four tracks at once, the speed variable by flywheels. The very first sampling device there ever was, as far as I know, was manufactured by Mountain Hardware for Apple computers. It was designed to reproduce voice samples, and had a very limited selection of pitches. I was using that onstage in '79 or '80, which was before the first Fairlight was used commercially. So I've always had a soft spot for sampling.

Visual art
Prior to his musical projects, Christopherson was a commercial artist, designer, and photographer. Notably, he was one of the three partners of the album cover design group Hipgnosis, which was responsible for many notable album covers of the 1970s, such as those of Pink Floyd (Wish You Were Here) and Peter Gabriel (first three albums). He also designed the logo of UK fashion label BOY London.

As a freelance photographer, Christopherson shot the first promotional images of the Sex Pistols in 1976. He later provided design work for SEX, the fashion boutique owned by Malcolm McLaren and Vivienne Westwood.

Christopherson remained involved with commercial art up until his later life. He directed over 40 music videos—for artists such as Rage Against the Machine, The The, Van Halen, Sepultura and Robert Plant—and was responsible for a high number of television commercials. He filmed and directed the Threshold HouseBoys Choir DVD that was filmed in Thailand, as well as the infamous Broken. November 2014 saw the publication of a big retrospective book simply called "Peter Christopherson - Photography" by Edition Timeless, collecting a lot of unseen photos from all areas of his work in photography but focusing on his private work.

Death
Christopherson died in his sleep on 25 November 2010, aged 55. The cause of  death was never made public. At the time of his death, Christopherson was working on a complete re-working of Nico's 1970 album Desertshore, to be released as the Throbbing Gristle album The Desertshore Installation.

Legacy
In addition to numerous other tributes, P-Orridge wrote a lengthy eulogy for Christopherson, in which they concluded:

Sleazy loved Bangkok and Thailand. He had been visiting regularly for several years before deciding to move there permanently after John/Jhonn/Geoff passed on. While we were spending time in 2009 with him we were pretty sick from the intense emotional stress of our ceremony in Nepal for the reliving and releasing of a beloved. Sleazy became a source of every suture for my heart, loving sustenance for my soul. He nurtured me with words of wise counsel garnered from his own similar and tragic losses. There had been a long sometimes desolate expanse between the seventies and now. But we had both crossed our abyss and we were blessed by Sleazy’s loving nature to be able to accept his gentle embrace and, crying like a child we often are, be able to lovingly say to him, “I HAVE GOT MY FRIEND BACK.” Many times, since then, we have stopped during hard times, confusing times, and we think of Sleazy and how his mastery of light went from cameras to hearts and souls, and that makes me smile and laugh. Which is as he would wish. We loved Sleazy in all he did…

Peter Gabriel published a brief post on his website on 26 November 2010 that opened with the statement: "We tip our hats to Mr Peter Christopherson". Speaking to the Quietus website in February 2014, Reznor stated: "[Coil's] 'Tainted Love' video remains one of the greatest music videos of all time ... If it's not immediately obvious: Horse Rotorvator was deeply influential on me. What they did to your senses. What they could do with sound. What Jhonn was doing lyrically ... Peter was a lovely guy. We had a respectful relationship."

Discography

Solo as Peter Christopherson
"In My Head A Crystal Sphere of Heavy Fluid" on Foxtrot (1998)
"All Possible Numbers" on Autumn Blood (Constructions) (2009)
"Time Machines II" (Posthumously released in 2014)
"The Art Of Mirrors - Homage To Derek Jarman" (Posthumously released in 2015)

Solo as The Threshold HouseBoys Choir
 ...It Just Is compilation contains the track "Mahil Athal Nadrach". (CD) (2005)
 X-Rated: The Dark Files compilation contains the track "So Young It Knows No Maturing". (CD) (2006)
 Form Grows Rampant debut album. (CD+DVD) (2007)
 Brainwaves 2008 compilation contains "Cap Rot Taxi" (CD) (2008)
 Amulet Edition limited release (200 pcs) 4 mini-cds in Amulet package (CD) (2008)

With SoiSong
 Soijin-No-Hi Octagonal CDEP / free download EP from www.soisong.com from March (2008)
 xAj3z Octagonal CD housed in fold out custom sleeve with colour inlay (2009)
 Soisong Octagonal COH CDEP / free download Sleazy EP from www.soisong.com (2010)

With Psychic TV
 Force the Hand of Chance
 Just Drifting
 Dreams Less Sweet
 Berlin Atonal Vol. 1
 Berlin Atonal Vol. 2
 N.Y. Scum
 Mein-Goett-In-Gen

Other contributions

Album artwork credits
This from Peter "Sleazy" Christopherson himself: "I worked as a free-lance photographer and contributor, then promoted to an assistant to Hipgnosis before becoming a partner, and continued to act also after I officially left the organization. So my contributions range from attempted but rejected artwork or design work, to partial contribution in either/both as an assistant, to being fully responsible for all design and artwork, such as the Peter Gabriel LPs. What you wish to document is up to you."

 A Certain Ratio – To Each...
 Dave Ball – In Strict Tempo
 Leather Nun – Slow Death EP
 Pink Floyd – A Nice Pair – "contributed photos as an assistant to Hipgnosis but did not do the design" – PC
 Pink Floyd – Animals (credited on LP and CD cover to Hipgnosis)
 Pink Floyd – Wish You Were Here (credited on LP and CD cover to Hipgnosis)
 Peter Gabriel – Peter Gabriel, aka "Peter Gabriel I" or "Car"  (credited on LP and CD cover to Hipgnosis)
 Peter Gabriel – Peter Gabriel, aka "Peter Gabriel II" or "Scratch"  (credited on LP and CD cover to Hipgnosis)
 Peter Gabriel – Peter Gabriel, aka "Peter Gabriel III" or "Melt"  (credited on LP and CD cover to Hipgnosis)

References

Further reading

External links

Coil official website
Throbbing Gristle official website
Last-ever video appearance of Peter "Sleazy" Christopherson (November 2010)
Peter Christopherson obituary on BBC Radio 4

1955 births
2010 deaths
British industrial musicians
Coil (band) members
English experimental musicians
English music video directors
English gay musicians
English gay artists
English electronic musicians
English keyboardists
Musicians from Leeds
LGBT directors
Photographers from Yorkshire
English expatriates in Thailand
English LGBT photographers
English LGBT songwriters
Gay photographers
Gay songwriters
Psychic TV members
Throbbing Gristle members
20th-century English LGBT people
21st-century English LGBT people
Rosa Mundi (group) members